Charles L. Smith may refer to:

Charles L. Smith (Canadian politician) (1853–?), Canadian politician in New Brunswick
Charles L. Smith (Seattle politician) (1892–1982), mayor of Seattle, Washington
Charles Lynwood Smith Jr. (born 1943), U.S. federal judge
Charles Lee Smith (1887–1964), American atheist activist
Charles Loraine Smith (1751–1835), sportsman, artist and politician